George Francis (May 5, 1970 Araden, Iraq - October 10, 1999) was an Assyrian hero and martyr. He was member of Mesopotamia Freedom Party.

References

1907 births
1999 deaths
Assyrian activists
Iraqi activists